Antonis Petropoulos (born 28 January 1986) is a Greek former professional footballer who played as a striker.

He was also part of Greece youth national teams.

Career

Egaleo
Petropoulos was born on 28 January 1986 in Athens, Greece. He scored 4 goals in total, 3 of them in his last two games with Egaleo. He scored his first goal against Kerkyra FC in 2006, and 2 goals against Ethnikos Asteras in 2008.

Panathinaikos
In January 2008, Petropoulos joined Panathinaikos FC signing a contract with a minimum release fee clause of €6,000,000 and a year later has signed a new 3-year contract with the club. Petropoulos is believed to have signed a deal that could see his annual wage rise from €45,000 to €150,000. The striker spoke of his pleasure at having re-signed with the club following the completion of the deal. "I am extremely happy to stay at Panathinaikos," Petropoulos said. "I want to play at this club for many more years. I want to thank my coach, Henk Ten Cate and the management; I will fight to justify the confidence they have shown in me." He scored 7 times in the 2008–09 season, however he remained in the bench for the whole of 2009–10 season as Djibril Cissé was the main offence choice. Due to a Cisse injury, he started the premiere of the 2010–11 season against Xanthi, where he scored the only goal for Panathinaikos in a match that ended 1–1. On 19 December 2012 he played and scored against Proodeftiki F.C. in the Greek cup for his last time with Panathinaikos.

Petropoulos joined the Cretan side on a loan deal from Panathinaikos FC. He scored 4 goals in total, one against Veria FC.

AEK Athens
After the mayhem of transfer deadline day, a reminder – perhaps – that the best things in life are free. Unable to get regular football in five years at Panathinaikos, Petropoulos was released and immediately signed by stricken giants AEK Athens, bottom of Greece Super League with three wins in 15 top-flight matches. Petropoulos became the 19th player who transferred from Panathinaikos F.C. to rivals AEK F.C.

However, since his debut in the 3–1 loss at Asteras Tripolis in early January, he has scored in each of AEK's next three games, with the resulting seven points lifting his side – never relegated – to 12th in the 16-team competition. More specifically, he scored his first goal in a Superleague Greece match against Skoda Xanthi F.C. He scored another goal against Aris F.C. on 20 January with a great header after a cross by Michalis Pavlis He scored for third match in a row against OFI. "I don't even want to utter the word 'relegation' – we are talking about AEK and I cannot imagine a league without AEK," said Petropoulos, who celebrated his 27th birthday on Monday. "I feel better now going onto the pitch because I am playing for a club who believe in me. I have nothing to prove. I know who I am and I always do my best."

Apollon Smyrnis, OFI Crete and Kalloni
On 20 June 2013 Petropoulos, after the relegation of his former team AEK, signed a €130,000 one-year contract with the newly promoted in Greece Super League, Apollon Smyrnis.

On 18 August 2013, Petropoulos made his debut with his new team and scored one goal in a 2–1 home victory against Aris. Besides the fact that Apollon Smyrni did not avoid relegation, Petropoulos has the best year in his career by scoring 12 goals. As a result of his exceptional year, Metz, Chievo Verona and Hellas Verona are interested in him.

In the summer of 2014 due to Apollon Smyrni's relegation to second division Petropoulos signed for OFI Crete, joined the club for second time in his career. He scored a 91st-minute winner on his debut. Petropoulos left OFI half a year later due to serious financial problems at the club.

On 21 January 2015, Petropoulos agreed with Kalloni till the end of 2014–15 season. On 12 May 2015, he solved his contract with the club.

Bari 1908

Petropoulos passes for the first time in his career, the Greek borders in order to pursue his career in Italian club Bari 1908 playing for Serie B. The Greek winger passed the medical examinations, signing a two years' contract with the club for an undisclosed fee.
On 17 October 2015, in the 8th day of 2015–16 Serie B season he made his debut as a substitute in an away 3–0 loss from Ternana Calcio.
After a rather catastrophic season, the Greek striker is going to use his option clause and ask for the termination of his contract with the club as did not manage to be among the first priorities of Andrea Camplone, playing only in five games.

Return to Greece
On 24 August 2016, Petropoulos agreed with Apollon Smyrnis till the end of 2016–17 season. On 9 July 2017, newly promoted to Superleague club Lamia and Aris are monitoring the case of experienced striker, who is expected to leave his current team soon.
On 20 September 2017, he signed a contract with Football League club Doxa Drama for an undisclosed fee. Three months later, he mutually solved his contract with the club. On 6 January 2018, Petropoulos signed with Superleague club Platanias for the rest of the 2017–18 season, in order to help with his experience the struggling club to remain in the Superleague.

Statistics

Club

1Includes Greek Superleague playoffs.

References

1986 births
Living people
Greece under-21 international footballers
Greece youth international footballers
Greek expatriate footballers
Super League Greece players
Panathinaikos F.C. players
Apollon Smyrnis F.C. players
OFI Crete F.C. players
Egaleo F.C. players
S.S.C. Bari players
Football League (Greece) players
Serie B players
Expatriate footballers in Italy
Association football forwards
Footballers from Athens
Greek footballers